"Old Side of Town" is a song written and recorded by American country music artist Tom T. Hall. It was released in December 1979 as the second and final single from the album, Ol't's in Town. The song peaked at number 9 on both the U.S. and Canadian country singles chart.

Content 

The narrator tells the tale of the old days in a traditional country setting.

Chart performance

References 
 

1979 singles
Tom T. Hall songs
Songs written by Tom T. Hall
1979 songs